Ficus lilliputiana is a fig that is endemic to the Kimberleys and Kununurra in northwestern Australia. It was first described in 2001 by Australian botanist Dale J. Dixon.

References

lilliputiana
Desert fruits
Drought-tolerant plants
Rosids of Western Australia
Rosales of Australia
Trees of Australia